The Special Operations Assault Rifle (SOAR) is an assault rifle manufactured by FERFRANS and designed as an improvement of the M4 carbine.

Details
The SOAR is a selective fire 5.56×45mm NATO assault rifle firing from either a closed rotating bolt (direct impingement) for the standard SOAR model, or in a short-stroke piston rotating bolt for the SOAR-P variant.

It differs from the typical M4 due to FERFRANS' preference to better control on full-automatic mode. Among the features include a patented Delayed Sear Activation System that reduces its cyclic rate of fire in full-auto to just around 550 to 680 rpm, reducing muzzle climb and improving control-ability.  It also uses a heavy machine gun barrel for increased reliability in sustained firing, rifled in either 1:7 or 1:9 right-hand twist.

Variants
The SOAR is available in both the standard SOAR or the piston-driven SOAR-P.

Barrel length options for the SOAR are in 10.5", 11.5", 14.5", 16", 18", and 20" lengths.

Known upgrades are known as the 10.5 Mk2, 10.5 Mk2-2 and the 11 Mk2.

Users

: Philippine Army Special Operations Command, PNP Special Action Force, Lapu-Lapu City SWAT
: Limited use by Special Actions Unit of the Royal Malaysia Police
:  Limited use by Naval Special Warfare Command (Thailand) and Arintaraj 26
: Limited use with some SWAT teams
: Limited use by Military Marksman Demonstration Team.

References

External links
 Official Page
 Defense Review

5.56 mm firearms
Carbines
Police weapons
Weapons of the Philippines
Firearms articles needing expert attention
ArmaLite AR-10 derivatives
AR-15 style rifles